Augustine Owen Eguavoen (born 19 August 1965) is a Nigerian football manager and former player who thrice served as manager of the Nigeria national team.

Playing career

Club
During his varied career Eguavoen began his career with ACB Lagos in his native Nigeria, some impressive performances gained him a move to Gent in 1986. He went on to play for K.V. Kortrijk, CD Ourense, Sacramento Scorpions, Torpedo Moscow and finished his career in Malta with Sliema Wanderers.

International 
Eguavoen was a member of the Nigeria national team squad that qualified for the country's first ever World Cup in 1994, and won the African Nations Cup in the same year.

Coaching career

Sliema Wanderers
Eguavoen began his coaching career in Malta with Sliema Wanderers, he was given the job for the 2000–01 season, and guided the club to a second-place finish.

Nigeria
Eguavoen was appointed the caretaker coach of the Nigeria national team in June 2005 with his coaching staff including Samson Siasia, Daniel Amokachi and Ike Shorunmu. He managed the Nigeria national team at the 2006 Africa Cup of Nations in Egypt, where the team won a bronze medal, beating Senegal in the third-place play-off. He was sacked in April 2006.

Black Leopards
Eguavoen then moved to South Africa, to take over Premier Soccer League side Black Leopards in March 2008.

Enyimba International
In the 2008–09 season, Eguavoen was head coach at Enyimba International in Aba, however he left soon after, leading them to a 3rd-place finish in league and winning the Federation Cup.

Return to Nigeria
In June 2010, the Nigeria Football Federation asked Eguavoen to replace Swedish Lars Lagerbäck until he decide his future plans. He was brought in as caretaker manager but said that he has no intention of submitting an application to take the role on a permanent basis. Eguavoen was also appointed as the head coach of the Nigeria national under-23 football team in August 2010. He expected his team would have a qualification for the 2012 London Olympic Games, but they were knocked out in the group stage. On 5 December 2011, he resigned from his job following the failure to secure the Olympics ticket.

On 27 October 2012, he was named manager of Sharks F.C. to allow John Obuh to concentrate on the Nigeria Under-20 team. He resigned however after seven games when the team started at the bottom of the table. He signed in April 2013 to coach Nigeria National League side COD United.

In November 2013, he was hired by the Edo State government to coach Bendel Insurance with the intent of getting them back to the Premier League. He resigned in July 2014 to take over Gombe United F.C.

In April 2017, he joined Sunshine Stars. but was let go in June after a home loss to league leaders Plateau United.

In October 2020, the Nigerian Football Federation, appointed Eguavoen as the Technical Director of the Federation.

On 12 December 2021, Eguavoen was appointed manager of Nigeria on an interim basis for the 2021 Africa Cup of Nations, following the departure of Gernot Rohr. After Nigeria exited from the round of sixteen with an agonising defeat to Tunisia, he returned to his position as the Technical Director of the side.

Honours

As a Player
Nigeria
Africa Cup of Nations: 1994 (Winner)

As a Coach
Nigeria
Africa Cup of Nations: 2006 (Bronze)

Enyimba International
Federation Cup 2008/09 Season (Winner)

References

External links
 

1965 births
Living people
Africa Cup of Nations-winning players
Nigerian footballers
Association football defenders
Nigeria international footballers
Olympic footballers of Nigeria
Footballers at the 1988 Summer Olympics
1994 FIFA World Cup players
1995 King Fahd Cup players
1998 FIFA World Cup players
1988 African Cup of Nations players
1992 African Cup of Nations players
1994 African Cup of Nations players
Belgian Pro League players
Challenger Pro League players
Liga Portugal 2 players
USISL players
Russian Premier League players
ACB Lagos F.C. players
K.A.A. Gent players
K.V. Kortrijk players
CD Ourense footballers
Sacramento Scorpions players
FC Torpedo Moscow players
FC Torpedo-2 players
Sliema Wanderers F.C. players
Nigerian football managers
2006 Africa Cup of Nations managers
Bendel Insurance F.C. managers
Nigeria national football team managers
Black Leopards F.C. managers
Enyimba F.C. managers
Nigerian expatriate footballers
Nigerian expatriate sportspeople in Belgium
Expatriate footballers in Belgium
Nigerian expatriate sportspeople in Spain
Expatriate footballers in Spain
Nigerian expatriate sportspeople in the United States
Expatriate soccer players in the United States
Nigerian expatriate sportspeople in Russia
Expatriate footballers in Russia
Nigerian expatriate sportspeople in Malta
Expatriate footballers in Malta
Sportspeople from Delta State